The Constitutional Court of Korea is one of two highest courts in court system of South Korea. It is composed of nine Constitutional Court Justices, and one of them is the 'President of the Court'. The exact number of Constitutional Court Justices is determined by article 111(2) of the Constitution of South Korea.

By article 111(2) of the Constitution, all of the Constitutional Court Justices are appointed by the President of South Korea. However, following article 111(3) of the Constitution, three of the Constitutional Court Justices should be appointed from candidates selected by the National Assembly, and another three of Constitutional Court Justices should be appointed from candidates nominated by the Supreme Court Chief Justice. Thus, only three of nine Constitutional Court Justices are directly appointed by the President of South Korea.  They serve for renewable term of six-year under article 112(1) of the Constitution, yet there are only two Justices who tried to renew their term because it could eventually harm judicial independence by amplifying influence of the President of South Korea on the Constitutional Court.

According to article 5(1) of 'Constitutional Court Act', Constitutional Court Justices should be at least 40 years old, and should also have more than 15 years of career in legal practice or academia with license of attorney at law.

Current Justices 
Below table is list of current Justices in Constitutional Court of Korea.

Former Justices 
Below table is list of former Justices in Constitutional Court of Korea. Since South Korea adopted American styled 3-year law school system for legal education in year 2008, 'education' column of below table means where former Justices received undergraduate degree.

See also 
 Judiciary of South Korea
 Constitutional Court of Korea
 President of the Constitutional Court of Korea
 Lists of supreme court justices

Notes and References 

South Korea